Satelmish-e Tupkhaneh (also Romanized as Sātelmīsh-e Tūpkhāneh) is a village in Zarrineh Rud Rural District, in the Central District of Miandoab County, West Azerbaijan Province, Iran. At the 2006 census, its population was 293, in 76 families.

References 

Populated places in Miandoab County